The 1930–31 season was Port Vale's 25th season of football in the English Football League, and their 34th in the Second Division following their promotion from the Third Division North the previous season. They finished fifth with 47 points, making it the most successful season in the club's history in terms of league position. They were seven points short of promotion to the top-flight, and seventeen points clear of relegation.

Overview

Second Division
The pre-season saw the arrival of goalscoring forward Harry Roberts from Lincoln City; big goalkeeper Arthur Slater from Clapton Orient; and young outside-left Clarence Spencer from Birmingham F.C.

The season started with a stylish 5–2 victory over Barnsley in front of a disappointingly low attendance of under 10,000. Two defeats followed, and Albert Pynegar put in a transfer request after being dropped from the first team. Bob Connelly picked up an injury and so Jack Round was signed from Bolton Wanderers. On 20 September they travelled to Goodison Park to triumph over previously undefeated league leaders Everton 3–2 in front of 27,142 spectators. Two days later they tore Bradford Park Avenue apart 8–2, with a four-goal haul from Sam Jennings. On 4 October they travelled to Home Park, where they lost 2–1 to Plymouth Argyle; later in the day a horrific tragedy almost killed many of the Vale players – they had hired a speedboat at Devon resort which burst into flames whilst at sea, fortunately the pilot managed to extinguish the flames and returned them safely to harbour.

Pynegar left the club in October following rumours of a rift with teammate Jennings, he signed with Chesterfield of the Third Division North. Bert Fishwick was a more than able deputy. The defensive duo of Jimmy Oakes and Shino Shenton also proved formidable at the back. On 29 November promotion dreams took a knock at White Hart Lane, Spurs picking up a 5–0 win. Despite competing at the top end of the table The Old Recreation Ground rarely saw much more than 10,000 spectators. In December, reserve half-back George Whitcombe was sold to Notts County for 'a substantial amount', the money went towards ground improvements. The following month £10,000 worth of mortgage debenture bonds were released to the same ends. The Football Association would reject the club's ground improvement scheme, without giving a reason.

As the season entered its final stretch top scorer Jennings was dropped from the squad, and no adequate replacement was found until Stewart Littlewood was re-signed from Oldham Athletic, with Fishwick sold to Tranmere Rovers in order to meet Oldham's demands. In early April the "Valiants" beat high-flying West Bromwich Albion and Tottenham Hotspur, thereby keeping hopes of promotion high. West Brom won the return leg at The Hawthorns to put daylight between the two clubs. In late April Vale travelled to the Netherlands for a short tour, beating Dutch Southern XI 5–1 and Zwaluwen 2–0.

They finished fifth with 47 points, making it the most successful season in the club's history in terms of league position. They were seven points short of second placed West Bromwich Albion. Only 61 goals were conceded, a record bettered only by West Brom and Spurs. A 67 goals scored tally however was almost half that of champions Everton. Sam Jennings finished with 17 goals, and Phil Griffiths and Harry Roberts were the only other major contributors. The ground improvements paid for were 3,500 seats on the Bryan Street stand, with a covered terrace.

Finances
On the financial side, an £800 loss was made, with the weather blamed for an average gate figure of 10,537. Numerous players were released, including Billy Briscoe, Frank Watkin, and Jack Maddock. Harry Roberts was also sold to Millwall. Meanwhile, Stewart Littlewood was also selected by the FA for a summer tour of Canada.

Cup competitions
In the FA Cup, Vale overcame amateur side Corinthians 3–1 in the Third Round, but then found themselves eliminated by First Division Birmingham at St Andrew's in the Fourth Round. The 44,119 attendance raised £2,763 for the club.

League table

Results
Port Vale's score comes first

Football League Second Division

Results by matchday

Matches

FA Cup

Player statistics

Appearances

Top scorers

Transfers

Transfers in

Transfers out

References
Specific

General

Port Vale F.C. seasons
Port Vale